The Royal Meteorological Society is a long-established institution that promotes academic and public engagement in weather and climate science. Fellows of the Society must possess relevant qualifications, but Associate Fellows can be lay enthusiasts. Its Quarterly Journal is one of the world's leading sources of original research in the atmospheric sciences. The chief executive officer is Liz Bentley.

Constitution
The Royal Meteorological Society traces its origins back to 3 April 1850 when the British Meteorological Society was formed as "a society the objects of which should be the advancement and extension of meteorological science by determining the laws of climate and of meteorological phenomena in general". Along with nine others, including James Glaisher, John Drew, Edward Joseph Lowe, The Revd Joseph Bancroft Reade, and Samuel Charles Whitbread, Dr John Lee, an astronomer, of Hartwell House, near Aylesbury, Buckinghamshire founded in the library of his house the British Meteorological Society, which became the Royal Meteorological Society. It became The Meteorological Society in 1866, when it was incorporated by Royal Charter, and the Royal Meteorological Society in 1883, when Her Majesty Queen Victoria granted the privilege of adding 'Royal' to the title. Along with 74 others, the famous meteorologist Luke Howard joined the original 15 members of the Society at its first ordinary meeting on 7 May 1850. As of 2008 it has more than 3,000 members worldwide. The chief executive of the Society is Professor Liz Bentley. Paul Hardaker previously served as chief executive from 2006 to 2012.

Membership 
There are four membership categories:

 Honorary Fellow
 Fellow (FRMetS)
 Associate Fellow
 Corporate member

Awards
The society regularly awards a number of medal and prizes, of which the Symons Gold Medal (established in 1901) and the Mason Gold Medal (established in 2006) are pre-eminent. The two medals are awarded alternately.

Other awards include the Buchan Prize, the Hugh Robert Mill Award, the L F Richardson Prize, the Michael Hunt Award, the Fitzroy Prize, the Gordon Manley Weather Prize, the International Journal of Climatology Prize, the Society Outstanding Service Award and the Vaisala Award.

Journals 
The society has a number of regular publications:

 Atmospheric Science Letters: a monthly magazine that provides a peer reviewed publication route for new shorter contributions in the field of atmospheric and closely related sciences.
 Weather: a monthly magazine with many full colour illustrations and photos for specialists and general readers with an interest in meteorology. It uses a minimum of mathematics and technical language.
 Quarterly Journal of the Royal Meteorological Society: as one of the world's leading journals for meteorology publishes original research in the atmospheric sciences. There are eight issues per year.
 Meteorological Applications: this is a journal for applied meteorologists, forecasters and users of meteorological services and has been published since 1994. It is aimed at a general readership and authors are asked to take this into account when preparing papers.
 International Journal of Climatology: has 15 issues a year and covers a broad spectrum of research in climatology.
 WIREs Climate Change: a journal about climate change
 Geoscience Data Journal: an online, open-access journal.

All publications are available online but a subscription is required for some. However certain "classic" papers are freely available on the Society's website.

Local centres and special interest groups 
The society has several local centres across the UK.

There are also a number of special interest groups which organise meetings and other activities to facilitate exchange of information and views within specific areas of meteorology. These are informal groups of professionals interested in specific technical areas of the profession of meteorology. The groups are primarily a way of communicating at a specialist level.

Presidents 
Source:

 1850–1853: Samuel Charles Whitbread, first time
 1853–1855: George Leach
 1855–1857: John Lee 
 1857–1858: Robert Stephenson 
 1859–1860: Thomas Sopwith 
 1861–1862: Nathaniel Beardmore
 1863–1864: Robert Dundas Thomson , died in office
 1864: Samuel Charles Whitbread , second time
 1865–1866: Charles Brooke 
 1867–1868: James Glaisher 
 1869–1870: Charles Vincent Walker 
 1871–1872: John William Tripe
 1873–1875: Robert James Mann
 1876–1877: Henry Storks Eaton
 1878–1879: Charles Greaves
 1880–1881: George James Symons , first time
 1882–1883: Sir John Knox Laughton
 1884–1885: Robert Henry Scott 
 1886–1887: William Ellis 
 1888–1889: William Marcet 
 1890–1891: Baldwin Latham
 1892–1893: Charles Theodore Williams, first time
 1894–1895: Richard Inwards
 1896–1897: Edward Mawley
 1898–1899: Francis Campbell Bayard
 1900: George James Symons , second time; died in office
 1900: Charles Theodore Williams, second time
 1901–1902: William Henry Dines
 1903–1904: Captain David W. Barker 
 1905–1906: Richard Bentley
 1907–1908: Hugh Robert Mill 
 1910–1911: Henry Mellish 
 1911–1912: Henry Newton Dickson 
 1913–1914: Charles John Philip Cave, first time
 1915–1917: Sir Henry George Lyons 
 1918–1919: Sir Napier Shaw 
 1920–1921: Reginald Hawthorn Hooker
 1922–1923: Charles Chree 
 1924–1925: Charles John Philip Cave, second time
 1926–1927: Sir Gilbert Walker 
 1928–1929: Richard Gregory
 1930–1931: Rudolf Gustav Karl Lempfert 
 1932–1933: Sydney Chapman 
 1934–1935: Ernest Gold 
 1936–1937: Francis John Welsh Whipple
 1938–1939: Sir Bernard A. Keen 
 1940–1941: Sir George Clarke Simpson 
 1942–1944: David Brunt 
 1945–1946: Gordon Manley
 1947–1949: G. M. B. Dobson 
 1949–1951: Sir Robert Alexander Watson-Watt 
 1951–1953: Sir Charles Normand 
 1953–1955: Sir Graham Sutton 
 1955–1957: Reginald Sutcliffe
 1957–1959: Percival Albert Sheppard
 1959–1961: James Martin Stagg 
 1961–1963: Howard Latimer Penman
 1963–1965: John Stanley Sawyer 
 1965–1967: G. D. Robinson
 1967–1968: F. Kenneth Hare
 1968–1970: John Mason 
 1970–1972: Frank Pasquill
 1972–1974: Robert B. Pearce 
 1974–1976: Raymond Hide 
 1976–1978: John T. Houghton 
 1978–1980: John Monteith 
 1980–1982: Philip Goldsmith
 1982–1984: Henry Charnock 
 1984–1986: Andrew Gilchrist
 1986–1988: Richard S. Scorer
 1988–1990: Keith Anthony Browning 
 1990–1992: Stephen Austen Thorpe 
 1992–1994: Paul James Mason
 1994–1996: John E. Harries
 1996–1998: David J. Carson
 1998–2000: Sir Brian Hoskins 
 2000–2002: David Burridge
 2002–2004: Howard Cattle
 2004–2006: Chris Collier
 2006–2008: Geraint Vaughan
 2008–2010: Julia Slingo 
 2010–2012: Tim Palmer 
 2012–2014: Joanna Haigh 
 2014–2016: Jennie Campbell
 2016–2018: Ellie Highwood
 2018–2020: David Warrilow 
 2020–2022: David Griggs

Notable fellows

 John Farrah (1849–1907).

See also 
List of atmospheric dispersion models
UK Dispersion Modelling Bureau
Met Office

References

External links 

 The RMetS website
 UK Atmospheric Dispersion Modelling Liaison Committee (ADMLC) web site

 
Meteorological societies
Meteorological
Scientific organisations based in the United Kingdom
Atmospheric dispersion modeling
Climatological research organizations
Climate of the United Kingdom
Geographic societies
Learned societies of the United Kingdom
Scientific organizations established in 1850
1850 establishments in the United Kingdom